The 1992–93 League Cup was the twenty-second season for the League Cup, a rugby league competition that was known as the Regal Trophy for sponsorship purposes.

Wigan defeated Bradford Northern by the score of 15-8 in the final to claim the trophy. The match was played at Elland Road, Leeds in front of an attendance of 13,221.

Background 
This season saw several changes in the  entrants, one club re-formed/renamed, two French clubs were invited instead of the  junior clubs, and one club withdrew. This resulted in one less club/entrant reducing the total number to thirty-seven.

The  changes, in detail, are:

 Trafford Borough re-formed as Blackpool Gladiators and moved back to Blackpool, playing at Jepson Way, Blackpool
 Two French clubs, Carcassonne and XIII Catalan were invited to join the  competition, instead of the  junior clubs, who were no longer invited
 Scarborough Pirates went into administration at the end of previous season

The preliminary round involved ten clubs, to reduce the numbers of entrants to the  first round proper to thirty-two.

Competition and results

Preliminary round 
Involved  5 matches and 10 clubs

Round 1 - First  Round 
Involved  16 matches and 32 clubs

Round 2 - Second  Round 
Involved  8 matches and 16 clubs

Round 2 - Second  Round replays 
Involved  1 match and 2 clubs

Round 3 -Quarter-finals 
Involved 4 matches with 8 clubs

Round 4 – Semi-finals 
Involved 2 matches and 4 clubs

Final

Teams and scorers 

Scoring - Try = four points - Goal = two points - Drop goal = one point

Prize money 
As part of the sponsorship deal and funds, the  prize money awarded to the competing teams for this season is as follows :-

Note - the  author is unable to trace the award amounts for this season. Can anyone help ?

The road to success 
This tree excludes any preliminary round fixtures

Notes and comments 
1 * Grundy Hill was the home ground of Horwich RMI, in Bolton
2 * The second highest score, at the  time
3 * RUGBYLEAGUEproiject gives the attendance as 3,475 but Widnes official archives gives it as 3,343
4 * RUGBYLEAGUEproiject gives the attendance as 7,682 but Wigan official archives gives it as 8,000
5 * RUGBYLEAGUEproiject and Wigan official archives gives the score as 12-34 but Wigan's official detailed archives erroneously gives it as 12-24 whilst showing that 4 tries and 4 goals were scored
6 * Wigan's official detailed archives erroneously shows the second semi-final as St. Helens 8 Castleford 12, (which was actually the third round clash)
8  * Elland Road,  Leeds,  is the home ground of Leeds United A.F.C. with a capacity of 37,914 (The record attendance was 57,892 set on 15 March 1967 for a cup match Leeds v Sunderland). The ground was originally established in 1897 by Holbeck RLFC who played there until their demise after the conclusion of the 1903-04 season   On their demise the ground was taken over by Leeds City F.C. After their expulsion from The Football League eight games into the 1919–20 season, leading to their liquidation the ground was taken over by, and is still the home ground, of Leeds United

General information for those unfamiliar 
The council of the Rugby Football League voted to introduce a new competition, to be similar to The Football Association and Scottish Football Association's "League Cup". It was to be a similar knock-out structure to, and to be secondary to, the Challenge Cup. As this was being formulated, sports sponsorship was becoming more prevalent and as a result John Player and Sons, a division of Imperial Tobacco Company, became sponsors, and the competition never became widely known as the "League Cup" 
The competition ran from 1971-72 until 1995-96 and was initially intended for the professional clubs plus the two amateur BARLA National Cup finalists. In later seasons the entries were expanded to take in other amateur and French teams. The competition was dropped due to "fixture congestion" when Rugby League became a summer sport
The Rugby League season always (until the onset of "Summer Rugby" in 1996) ran from around August-time through to around May-time and this competition always took place early in the season, in the Autumn, with the final usually taking place in late January 
The competition was variably known, by its sponsorship name, as the Player's No.6 Trophy (1971–1977), the John Player Trophy (1977–1983), the John Player Special Trophy (1983–1989), and the Regal Trophy in 1989.

See also 
1992-93 Rugby Football League season
1992 Lancashire Cup
1992 Yorkshire Cup
Regal Trophy
Rugby league county cups

References

External links
Saints Heritage Society
1896–97 Northern Rugby Football Union season at wigan.rlfans.com 
Hull&Proud Fixtures & Results 1896/1897
Widnes Vikings - One team, one passion Season In Review - 1896-97
The Northern Union at warringtonwolves.org
Huddersfield R L Heritage
Wakefield until I die

League Cup (rugby league)
League Cup
League Cup
League Cup
League Cup